The Educational Zone is a school community in Abu Dhabi, United Arab Emirates which houses several international schools. The zone is located in Muroor Community and neighbours the Embassies Community.

External links
Official website

 
Schools in the Emirate of Abu Dhabi